Patricia Demilly (born Marchand; 27 December 1959 at Arnouville-lès-Gonesse) is a former French athlete, who specialized in the middle distance races.

Biography  
Patricia excelled  in the IAAF World Cross Country Championships winning the team silver medal in 1987 and 1989 and the team bronze medal in 1988.

She won two French national athletic titles for the 1500 meters in 1987 and 
1988.

Prize list  
 French Championships in Athletics   :  
 2 times winner 1,500 m in 1987 and 1988.

Records

Notes and references  
 Docathlé2003, Fédération française d'athlétisme, 2003, p. 419

1959 births
French female middle-distance runners
Living people
French female long-distance runners
20th-century French women